Kirichenkov is a rural locality (a khutor) in Alexeyevsky District, Belgorod Oblast, Russia. The population was 85 as of 2010. There are 2 streets.

Geography 
Kirichenkov is located 25 km southeast of Alexeyevka (the district's administrative centre) by road. Kuleshov is the nearest rural locality.

References 

Rural localities in Alexeyevsky District, Belgorod Oblast
Biryuchensky Uyezd